Wiener Neustadt is a city located south of Vienna.

Other articles
 Wiener Neustadt East Airport
 Wiener Neustadt West Airport
 Wiener Neustadt Canal
 Wiener Neustadt Hauptbahnhof
 Wiener Neustadt Island
 Wiener Neustadt-Land District
 Wiener Neustädter Lokomotivfabrik
 Bombing of Wiener Neustadt in World War II
 Burg Wiener Neustadt
 Diocese of Wiener Neustadt
 Peace Treaty of Wiener Neustadt
 SC Wiener Neustadt
 Siege of Wiener Neustadt
 Stadion Wiener Neustadt
 University of Applied Sciences Wiener Neustadt